The 2009 African Nations Championship was an international football tournament held in the Ivory Coast from 22 February to 8 March 2009. The eight national teams involved in the tournament were required to register a squad of 23 players, including three goalkeepers. Unlike the Africa Cup of Nations, this tournament exclusively requires players to be registered to a club within their country to be eligible. Expatriate players, even if they play in Africa, cannot participate in the event.

Final squads were confirmed by the Confederation of African Football on 21 February. The age listed for each player is on 22 February 2009, the first day of the tournament.

Group A

Ivory Coast
The squad of Ivory Coast, the host nation, was announced by head coach Georges Kouadio on 13 February 2009.

Senegal
The squad of Senegal was announced by head coach Joseph Koto on 14 February 2009.

Tanzania
Head Coach:  Marcio Maximo

Zambia
The squad of Zambia was announced by head coach Hervé Renard on 11 February 2009.

Group B

DR Congo
The squad of the DR Congo was announced by head coach Jean-Santos Muntubila on 10 February 2009.

Ghana
From a preliminary squad of 40 players, Ghana head coach Milovan Rajevac named the final squad on 14 February 2009.

Libya

Zimbabwe

References

2009 African Nations Championship
African Nations Championship squads